Trejo is a surname which originated in Spain in the region of Extremadura. During the Spanish colonial empire of the Americas many people with this surname immigrated to the region.

 Alan Trejo (born 1996), American baseball player
 Alejandro Trejo (born 1954), Chilean actor
 Arnulfo Trejo (1922–2002), American writer and professor
 Danny Trejo (born 1944), American film actor
 Germán Trejo, Mexican American activist
 José Luis Trejo (born 1951), Mexican football coach
 Lucas Trejo (born 1987), Argentine football player
 Mario Trejo (writer) (born 1926), Argentine poet, playwright, screenwriter and journalist
 Óscar Trejo (born 1988), Argentine footballer
 Stephen Trejo (born 1977), American football player

See also
Trejo pistol

Spanish-language surnames
Surnames of Mexican origin
Surnames of Venezuelan origin
Surnames of Argentine origin